Kamel Zouaghi (born 3 May 1971) is a Tunisian football manager.

References

1971 births
Living people
Tunisian football managers
Kawkab Marrakech managers
Olympic Club de Safi managers
EGS Gafsa managers
ES Beni-Khalled managers
Olympique Béja managers
ES Zarzis managers
AS Kasserine managers
CS Hammam-Lif managers
Ittihad Tanger managers
Tunisian expatriate football managers
Expatriate football managers in Morocco
Tunisian expatriate sportspeople in Morocco
Expatriate football managers in Saudi Arabia
Tunisian expatriate sportspeople in Saudi Arabia
Expatriate football managers in Bahrain
Tunisian expatriate sportspeople in Bahrain